"Turn Your Lights Down Low" is a song by Jamaican reggae band Bob Marley and the Wailers from their 1977 album, Exodus. It is the only song on side B of the album that was not released as a single. However, a remastered version featuring Lauryn Hill (credited as Bob Marley featuring Lauryn Hill) was released in 1999. The duet was commercially successful, peaking at number one on the UK R&B Chart while topping the charts in New Zealand and Romania. It received a nomination for Best Pop Collaboration with Vocals at the 43rd Grammy Awards.

Duet version

A cover/remixed version was released in October 1999, with original artist Bob Marley featuring American singer-songwriter Lauryn Hill. Hill contributes her vocals to the song as well as a rap verse. The single is taken from the compilation album Chant Down Babylon (1999), which features remixes and covers of Bob Marley songs by various modern day soul, hip-hop and rock artists. This duet became a hit in late 1999 and early 2000, reaching number one in New Zealand and Romania for two weeks. The song also reached the top 10 in the Netherlands, Norway, and Sweden. In France, where it peaked at number 14, it received a Gold certification for sales exceeding 250,000 copies.

Music video
An accompanying music video to the Lauryn Hill and Bob Marley remix was directed by Francis Lawrence and released in 1999. The video takes place in Jamaica and opens with a group of Jamaican kids playing soccer. Following this, are a series of panning shots showing night life in Jamaica, and scenes where Hill is singing in a recording studio. In other scenes, Hill is shown dancing at a party with former boyfriend Rohan Marley, son of Bob Marley.

Track listings
All songs are performed by Lauryn Hill except "Turn Your Lights Down Low" (Hill and Bob Marley), "To Zion" (Hill and Carlos Santana), and the original version of "Turn Your Lights Down Low" (Bob Marley and the Wailers).

Australian CD single
 "Turn Your Lights Down Low" (album version) – 4:02
 "The Sweetest Thing" – 4:49
 "Ex-Factor" (A Simple Breakdown) – 4:10

UK CD1
 "Turn Your Lights Down Low" – 4:02
 "Forgive Them Father" – 4:29
 "To Zion" – 4:33

UK CD2
 "Turn Your Lights Down Low" – 4:02
 "Turn Your Lights Down Low" (original version) – 3:38
 "Superstar" – 4:57

UK cassette single and European CD1
 "Turn Your Lights Down Low" (album version) – 4:02
 "Turn Your Lights Down Low" (original version) – 3:38

European CD2
 "Turn Your Lights Down Low" (album version) – 4:02
 "Turn Your Lights Down Low" (original version) – 3:38
 "Forgive Them Father" – 4:29
 "To Zion" – 4:33

Japanese CD single
 "Turn Your Lights Down Low"
 "Turn Your Lights Down Low" (original version)
 "Everything Is Everything"

Charts

Weekly charts

Year-end charts

Certifications

Release history

Covers
 Colbie Caillat made a cover version of this song on her 2008 album Coco.
 Megan Joy covered the song on American Idol season 8.
 Rosie Gaines covered the song on her album Closer Than Close. 
 K'LA sampled the song on her 2011 first single "All Your Love".
 Anita Antoinette covered the song on The Voice (U.S. season 7)
 Jim James covered the song on Sweetheart 2014.

See also
 List of number-one singles from the 1990s (New Zealand)
 List of Romanian Top 100 number ones of the 2000s

References

Bob Marley songs
1977 songs
1999 singles
Columbia Records singles
Lauryn Hill songs
Number-one singles in New Zealand
Number-one singles in Romania
Songs written by Bob Marley